The Limerick county hurling team represents Limerick in hurling and is governed by Limerick GAA, the county board of the Gaelic Athletic Association. The team competes in the three major annual inter-county competitions; the All-Ireland Senior Hurling Championship, the Munster Senior Hurling Championship and the National Hurling League.

Limerick's home ground is Páirc na nGael, Limerick. The team's manager is John Kiely.

The team last won the Munster Senior Championship in 2022, the All-Ireland Senior Championship in 2022 and the National League in 2020.

History
Limerick's first outright success in hurling was achieved when the Kilfinane club defeated Kilkenny GAA club Tullaroan in the final of the 1897 All-Ireland Senior Hurling Championship (SHC). At that time, counties were represented by champion clubs.

Limerick won the 1918 All-Ireland SHC, then repeated the feat in the 1921 All-Ireland SHC when the team won the inaugural Liam MacCarthy Cup. The team that achieved those wins featured many players who contested eight consecutive Munster Senior Hurling Championship (SHC) finals (1917–1924 inclusive), a record that has never been equalled.

The 1930s were the salad days of Limerick hurling, an era in which the county won five consecutive National Hurling League (NHL) titles, a record still unequalled. Those titles were won in 1933–34, 1934–35, 1935–36, 1936–37 and 1937–38. Limerick also won four consecutive Munster SHC titles, and remains the only team other than Cork to have done so. After winning All-Ireland SHC titles in 1934 and in 1936, another All-Ireland SHC title followed in 1940. The team from this era did much to raise the profile of the sport: whereas around 30,000 people attended the 1930 All-Ireland SHC Final, attendances had risen to 50,000 by the 1940 final and players such as the Mackeys (John and Mick), Ryans (Timmy and Mick), Clohesseys (Dave and Paddy), Bob McConkey and Paddy Scanlon were recalled for decades afterwards. Victory in 1940 left Limerick with six All-Ireland SHC titles and as the only team from outside the "big three" (Cork, Tipperary and Kilkenny) to have won more than one All-Ireland SHC title. Dublin had at that stage also six All-Ireland SHC titles but no native of that county had played on any of its winning teams. Limerick won a sixth NHL title in 1946–47 but success soon became a rarity.

Limerick won the 1970–71 NHL title and soon followed this by winning the 1973 All-Ireland SHC, its seventh title. Four further NHL titles followed that century: 1983–84, 1984–85, 1991–92 and, lastly, 1997.

In the early 2000s, Limerick won three consecutive All-Ireland Under-21 Hurling Championship titles (2000–2002).

In 2007, Limerick defeated Tipperary in a Munster SHC semi-final known as the Trilogy, as three games were required to separate the teams. The final scoreline of the second replay was 0–22 to 2–13. An attendance of 30,608 spectators witnessed Limerick defeat Tipperary for the first time since 1996. Limerick had not won a match in the Munster SHC since a 2001 comeback against Waterford, to a Munster SHC final the team subsequently lost to the "monkey on their back" or, as Seamus Hickey referred to them, "gorilla", Tipperary. However, Limerick subsequently lost the Munster SHC final to Waterford in Thurles on 8 July. The team regrouped and, in its All-Ireland SHC quarter-final on 29 July, defeated Clare by a scoreline of 1–23 to 1–16. Andrew O'Shaughnessy was named man of the match. On 12 August, Limerick played Waterford in the All-Ireland SHC semi-final, a rematch of the Munster SHC final that had been played a month previously. The result, though, was not the same. Limerick defeated Waterford by a scoreline of 5–11 to 2–15. The goals came from Donie Ryan (2), Andrew O'Shaughnessy (2 - one from play and one penalty) and Brian Begley (1). O'Shaughnessy was again named man of the match. This result meant that Limerick had qualified for the 2007 All-Ireland SHC Final, held at Croke Park on 2 September. Kilkenny defeated Limerick by a scoreline of 2–19 to 1–15.

With many predicting that Limerick would soon secure Munster and All-Ireland SHC titles, the team was drawn against Clare in the first round of the 2008 Munster SHC. However, Clare won by a scoreline of 4–12 to 1–16, eliminating Limerick from the Munster SHC. That result also led to Limerick advancing to a game against Offaly, as part of a newly revised All-Ireland SHC qualifying system. Limerick lost again, this time by a scoreline of 3–19 to 0–18, and the team's season came to an end.

Limerick opened against Waterford in the 2009 Munster SHC, with the game ending in a draw. Limerick narrowly lost the replay. That result led to Limerick advancing to the 2009 All-Ireland SHC qualifier series, where they defeated Wexford and Laois in tight affairs, then Dublin in an All-Ireland SHC quarter-final, to reach an All-Ireland SHC semi-final against Tipperary. Tipperary won that game comfortably, by 22 points, and Limerick's season was over. In the weeks that followed manager Justin McCarthy dropped 12 players (who only found out via the Irish Examiner) and a further 12 players withdrew from the panel in protest and refused to return as long as McCarthy was in charge. The Limerick County Board held three meetings in which it was decided McCarthy would be retained. Limerick were relegated from Division 1 of the 2010 NHL, losing all eight games. Limerick lost to Cork in the first round of the Munster SHC, then lost to Offaly in a 2010 All-Ireland SHC qualifier. In total Limerick lost its 10 matches by an average of 15 points. McCarthy subsequently resigned as manager. In September 2010, Dónal O'Grady was appointed as manager.

Limerick improved dramatically in the 2011 NHL, winning nearly every game and being promoted to Division 1 only to later end up in Division 1B. Limerick lost against Waterford in the Munster SHC, with John Mullane eventually scoring a late goal. Limerick then advanced the 2011 All-Ireland SHC qualifiers, defeating Wexford and also (comprehensively) defeating Antrim, to reach an All-Ireland SHC quarter-final against NHL title holder Dublin. Dublin won that game by a scoreline of 3–13 to 0–18, ending Limerick's season. O'Grady resigned as manager a few months later over his determination that he intended to stay as coach for only one year.

In October 2011, John Allen was appointed as manager. Inadequate fitness levels contributed to defeats against Clare in the Division 1B Final and against Tipperary in the Munster SHC in Allen's first year. However, an extensive specifically designed summer fitness course led to a marked improvement, then a creditable losing performance against Kilkenny in the 2012 All-Ireland SHC quarter-final offered hope for 2013. As in 2012, Dublin (managed by Anthony Daly) defeated Limerick in the 2013 NHL Division 1B Final. That summer would bring a pitch invasion by spectators as Limerick won a first Munster SHC title since 1996. The celebrations contributed to a loss of focus, leading Clare to win the 2013 All-Ireland SHC semi-final against Limerick at Croke Park.

The 2018 season concluded with Limerick winning the 2018 All-Ireland SHC, the team's first since 1973, with a 3–16 to 2–18 point defeat of Galway in the final. The team built on this success, winning the NHL in 2019 and 2020, the Munster SHC in 2019, 2020, 2021 and 2022 and the All-Ireland SHC again in 2020, 2021 and 2022.

Supporters
Musician Bruce Springsteen is a Limerick supporter. Dolores O'Riordan was another supporter. In the year of her death — when Limerick bridged a 45-year gap to win the 2018 All-Ireland SHC — "Dreams" by The Cranberries was immediately played at Croke Park to coincide with the festivities. The team later brought the trophy to her family home. Actor Bill Murray attended the 2022 All-Ireland Senior Hurling Championship semi-final victory over Galway at Croke Park, wearing a Limerick jersey.

Colours and crest

Kit evolution
Limerick made a limited edition jersey available in 2021 to commemorate the county's 1921 All-Ireland Senior Hurling Championship Final win, which coincided with the first presentation of the Liam MacCarthy Cup. An image of that trophy adorned the jersey's sleeve.

Limerick's jersey for the 2021 season went on sale on 24 March and had the titles of Limerick's 65 clubs across its front.

Limerick released a new jersey in advance of the 2023 season.

Current panel

INJ Player has had an injury which has affected recent involvement with the county team.
RET Player has since retired from the county team.
WD Player has since withdrawn from the county team due to a non-injury issue.

Recent call-ups
Manager John Kiely named four new men in his squad ahead of the 2021 National Hurling League. Those not listed above are included below.

The following players have also been called up to the Limerick panel.

Current management team
As of December 2020:
Manager: John Kiely
Coach–selectors: Paul Kinnerk, Donal O'Grady, Aonghus O'Brien, Alan Cunningham
Team performance psychologist: Caroline Currid
Strength and conditioning coach: Mikey Kiely
Goalkeeping coach: Timmy Houlihan
Assistant goalkeeping coach: Alan Feeley
Team doctor: James Ryan
Physiotherapists: Mark Melbourne, Mark van Drumpt
Video analyst: Seánie O'Donnell
Liaison officer: Conor McCarthy
Kitman: Ger O'Donnell
Logistics: Éibhear O'Dea
Nutritionist: Eoin Murray
Masseur: Adrian Kearns
Statistics: Kieran Hickey, Denny Ahern, Ruairí Maher

Notes

Managerial history

Players

Notable players

Records

Most appearances

Top scorers

Aaron Gillane is Limerick's all-time top scorer in league and championship (with a total of 20–406 in 56 appearances, as of 2022), overtaking Limerick's previous leading scorer Shane Dowling.

Shane Dowling was previously Limerick's all-time top scorer in league and championship (with a total of 21–292 in 59 appearances), overtaking Limerick's previous leading scorer Gary Kirby, before retiring at the age of 27 in 2020 due to knee cartilage issues.

All Stars
Limerick has 83 All Stars, as of 2022. 41 different players have won, as of 2022. Joe McKenna won six All Stars.

Bold denotes that a player also won Hurler of the Year for the year in question.

1971: Pat Hartigan, Éamonn Cregan
1972: Pat Hartigan2nd, Éamonn Cregan2nd
1973: Pat Hartigan3rd, Jim O'Brien, Seán Foley, Richie Bennis, Éamonn Grimes
1974: Pat Hartigan4th, Joe McKenna
1975: Pat Hartigan5th, Joe McKenna2nd, Éamonn Grimes2nd
1978: Joe McKenna3rd
1979: Joe McKenna4th
1980: Leonard Enright, Joe McKenna5th, Éamonn Cregan3rd
1981: Leonard Enright2nd, Liam O'Donoghue, Joe McKenna6th
1983: Leonard Enright3rd
1984: Paudie Fitzmaurice, Paddy Kelly
1991: Gary Kirby
1992: Tommy Quaid, Ciarán Carey
1994: Joe Quaid, Dave Clarke, Ciarán Carey2nd, Mike Houlihan, Gary Kirby2nd, Damien Quigley
1995: Gary Kirby3rd
1996: Joe Quaid2nd, Ciarán Carey3rd, Mark Foley, Mike Houlihan2nd, Gary Kirby4th
2001: Mark Foley2nd
2007: Brian Murray, Ollie Moran, Andrew O'Shaughnessy
2013: Richie McCarthy
2014: Seamus Hickey, Shane Dowling
2018: Seán Finn, Richie English, Dan Morrissey,  Declan Hannon, Cian Lynch, Graeme Mulcahy
2019: Aaron Gillane, Seán Finn2nd
2020: Nickie Quaid, Seán Finn3rd, Dan Morrissey2nd, Diarmaid Byrnes, Kyle Hayes, Gearóid Hegarty, Cian Lynch2nd, Tom Morrissey, Aaron Gillane2nd
2021: Seán Finn4th, Barry Nash, Diarmaid Byrnes2nd, Declan Hannon2nd, Kyle Hayes2nd, William O'Donoghue, Darragh O'Donovan, Gearóid Hegarty2nd, Cian Lynch3rd, Tom Morrissey2nd, Séamus Flanagan, Peter Casey
2022: Nickie Quaid2nd, Barry Nash2nd, Diarmaid Byrnes3rd, Declan Hannon3rd, Gearóid Hegarty3rd, Kyle Hayes3rd, Aaron Gillane3rd

Honours

National
All-Ireland Senior Hurling Championship
 Winners (11): 1897, 1918, 1921, 1934, 1936, 1940, 1973, 2018, 2020, 2021, 2022
 Runners-up (9): 1910, 1923, 1933, 1935, 1974, 1980, 1994, 1996, 2007
National Hurling League
 Winners (13): 1933–34, 1934–35, 1935–36, 1936–37, 1937–38, 1946–47, 1970–71, 1983–84, 1984–85, 1991–92, 1997, 2019, 2020
 Runners-up (9): 1932–33, 1957–58, 1969–70, 1971–72, 1972–73, 1973–74, 1979–80, 1982–83, 2006
All-Ireland Intermediate Hurling Championship
 Winners (1): 1998
All-Ireland Junior Hurling Championship
 Winners (4): 1935, 1941, 1954, 1957
All-Ireland Under-21 Hurling Championship
 Winners (6): 1987, 2000, 2001, 2002, 2015, 2017
All-Ireland Minor Hurling Championship
 Winners (3): 1940, 1958, 1984
All-Ireland Vocational Schools Championship
 Winners (1): 1961 (Limerick City)
Fr C. F. O'Reilly Cup (Poc Fada)
 Winners (8): 1899, 1900, 1935, 1941, 1942, 1962, 1963, 1964

Provincial
Munster Senior Hurling Championship
 Winners (23): 1897, 1910, 1911, 1918, 1921, 1923, 1933, 1934, 1935, 1936, 1940, 1955, 1973, 1974, 1980, 1981, 1994, 1996, 2013, 2019, 2020, 2021, 2022
 Runners-up (27): 1891, 1893, 1895, 1902, 1905, 1917, 1919, 1920, 1922, 1924, 1937, 1939, 1944, 1945, 1946, 1947, 1949, 1956, 1971, 1975, 1976, 1979, 1992, 1995, 2001, 2007, 2014 
Waterford Crystal Cup
 Winners (2): 2006, 2015
Munster Senior Hurling League
 Winners (2): 2018, 2020	
Munster Intermediate Hurling Championship
 Winners (3): 1968, 1998, 2008
Munster Junior Hurling Championship
 Winners (10): 1927, 1935, 1939, 1941,1946, 1948, 1952, 1954, 1957, 1986
Munster Under-21 Hurling Championship
 Winners (9): 1986, 1987, 2000, 2001, 2002, 2011, 2015, 2017, 2022
Munster Minor Hurling Championship
 Winners (9): 1940, 1958, 1963, 1965, 1984, 2013, 2014, 2019, 2020

Other
Players Champions Cup
 Winners (1): 2018
RTÉ Sports Team of the Year Award
 Winners (1): 2020

References

 
County hurling teams